La Goguette is a settlement in Guadeloupe in the commune of Port-Louis, on the island of Grande-Terre.  To its north are Anse-Bertrand and Mahaudiere.

Populated places in Guadeloupe